The Chinese fulvetta (Fulvetta striaticollis) is a bird species in the family Paradoxornithidae. Like the other typical fulvettas, it was long included in the Timaliidae genus Alcippe or in the Sylviidae.

It is found in China.

References

 Collar, N. J. & Robson, C. 2007. "Family Timaliidae (Babblers)". pp. 70–291. In: del Hoyo, J., Elliott, A. & Christie, D.A. eds. Handbook of the Birds of the World, Vol. 12. Picathartes to Tits and Chickadees. Lynx Edicions, Barcelona.

Birds of China
Chinese fulvetta
Birds of Central China
Endemic birds of China
Chinese fulvetta
Taxonomy articles created by Polbot